The Whiting Award is an American award presented annually to ten emerging writers in fiction, nonfiction, poetry and plays. The award is sponsored by the Mrs. Giles Whiting Foundation and has been presented since 1985. , winners receive US$50,000.

The nominees are chosen through a juried process, and the final winners are selected by a committee of writers, scholars, and editors, selected each year by the Foundation. Writers cannot apply for the prize themselves, and the Foundation does not accept unsolicited nominations.

Recipients

References

External links

Current Winners
Award Recipients from 2015-1985

Awards established in 1985
American fiction awards
American non-fiction literary awards
American poetry awards
Literary awards honoring writers
Dramatist and playwright awards
1985 establishments in the United States